National Route 368 is a national highway of Japan connecting Iga, Mie and Taki, Mie in Japan, with a total length of 74.5 km (46.29 mi).

References

National highways in Japan
Roads in Mie Prefecture
Roads in Nara Prefecture